Smaznevo is a rural locality (a station) and the administrative center of Smaznevsky Selsoviet, Zarinsky District, Altai Krai, Russia. The population was 1,193 as of 2013. There are 22 streets.

Geography 
Smaznevo is located 38 km northeast of Zarinsk (the district's administrative centre) by road.

References 

Rural localities in Zarinsky District